"Dr. Heckyll & Mr. Jive" is a song by the Australian musical group Men at Work. The song was written by Men at Work singer/guitarist Colin Hay, and the recording was produced by Peter McIan. It was released in October 1982 as the lead single from their second album Cargo.

The song is about a mad scientist named Dr. Heckyll (played by Men at Work keyboardist Greg Ham in the song's music video) who creates a potion that turns him into a smooth, handsome and talkative man. The title is a parody of Robert Louis Stevenson's 1886 novella The Strange Case of Dr Jekyll and Mr Hyde. The story is also very similar to the premise of the 1963 film The Nutty Professor.

Cash Box said that "sci-fi flick laboratory sounds lend authenticity to an otherwise Men At Work-manlike lively rhythmic and vocal tune."

Music video

The music video shows a Sherlock Holmes-esque detective (Colin Hay) who investigates the case of Dr. Heckyll (Greg Ham), a quirky mad scientist. One night, Heckyll goes out to a party at a house in the neighborhood and takes a swig of the potion he has been working on most recently.  Two girls walk in on him, harass him and also take swigs of the drink.  They turn into palm trees as a result. Heckyll notices this effect, and transforms into Mr. Jive, a handsome, talkative man who entertains people by playing the piano. The detective, under disguise as a Boy Scouts leader, arrives, but before he can investigate further, Heckyll reverts to normal form and, with his hunchbacked assistant (Jerry Speiser) leaves satisfied and happy into the sunrise.

The video was shot in Los Angeles, California, in 1982; Heckyll's house is 1325 Carroll Avenue.

The band members also appear as boy scouts and party guests.

Track listing

7": CBS / BA 222986 Australia 1982 
 "Dr. Heckyll & Mr. Jive" – 4:12
 "Shintaro" – 2:51

7": Epic / A 6276 Japan 1983 
 "Dr. Heckyll & Mr. Jive" – 4:12
 "No Restrictions" – 4:29

7": Columbia / TA 6276 USA 1983 
 "Dr. Heckyll & Mr. Jive" – 4:12
 "I Like To (Live)" – 4:23

12" Maxi-Single: Epic / TA 3668 UK 1983 
 "Dr. Heckyll & Mr. Jive" – 4:36
 "No Restrictions" – 4:29
 "Down Under (Live Version)" – 4:30
 "Be Good Johnny (Live Version)" – 4:32

Charts

Weekly charts

Year-end charts

References

1983 singles
1982 singles
Men at Work songs
Songs written by Colin Hay
1982 songs
Epic Records singles
Works based on Strange Case of Dr Jekyll and Mr Hyde